Monroe Thompson was a member of the Wisconsin State Assembly in 1848. Thompson represented the 4th District of Dodge County, Wisconsin. He was a Whig.

References

People from Dodge County, Wisconsin
Members of the Wisconsin State Assembly
Wisconsin Whigs
Year of birth missing
Year of death missing